Kirinda is a town in Sri Lanka. It is located in the Southern Province.

See also
List of towns in Central Province, Sri Lanka

External links

Populated places in Central Province, Sri Lanka